Italian loanwords exist in Libyan Arabic mainly, but not exclusively, as a technical jargon. For example, machinery parts, workshop tools, electrical supplies, names of fish species ...etc.

References 

Libyan Arabic
Italy–Libya relations
Romance languages in Africa